Chen Liangting (1929–2020) was a Chinese translator. He is famous for translating American literary works. He was a member of the China Democratic League.

Biography
Chen was born in Chaoyang District of Shantou, Guangdong, in 1929. He secondary studied at Guanghua Experimental Middle School. In 1947 he was accepted by Kwang Hua University (now East China Normal University). After university, he worked at Warner Films in Shanghai as a subtitle translator. Since 1951, he has been engaged in translation for foreign literature. Since 1978, he has focused on translating and introducing American contemporary dramas and popular fiction.

He was a member of the China Writers Association and Shanghai Museum of Literature and History.

Personal life
In 1951, Chen married Liu Wenlan (born 1931), who is also a translator. His father-in-law  was one of the early leaders of the Communist Party of China.

Translations
 The Old Man and the Sea
 The Ice On Kilimanjaro Mountain
 Gone with the Wind
 The Chronicles of Narnia
 The Maltese Falcon

Awards
 2003 "Senior Translator" – Chinese Translation Association

References

1929 births
2020 deaths
East China Normal University alumni
Writers from Shantou
English–Chinese translators
People from Chaoyang District, Shantou
People's Republic of China translators
People of the Republic of China